A pursuivant or, more correctly, pursuivant of arms, is a junior officer of arms. Most pursuivants are attached to official heraldic authorities, such as the College of Arms in London or the Court of the Lord Lyon in Edinburgh. In the mediaeval era, many great nobles employed their own officers of arms. Today, there still exist some private pursuivants that are not employed by a government authority. In Scotland, for example, several pursuivants of arms have been appointed by Clan Chiefs.  These pursuivants of arms look after matters of heraldic and genealogical importance for clan members.

Some Masonic Grand Lodges have an office known as the Grand Pursuivant. It is the Grand Pursuivant's duty to announce all applicants for admission into the Grand Lodge by their names and Masonic titles; to take charge of the jewels and regalia of the Grand Lodge; to attend all meetings of the Grand Lodge, and to perform such other duties as may be required by the Grand Master or presiding officer. The office is also at the local Masonic lodge level in the jurisdiction of the Grand Lodge of Pennsylvania. In that jurisdiction it is the Pursuivant's duty to guard the door of the lodge, and announce and escort applicants for admission into the lodge. The office is generally unknown at the local level in Masonic jurisdictions outside Pennsylvania, where these duties are performed by the Junior Deacon and   Senior Deacon.

Nationally appointed pursuivants

English Pursuivants of Arms in Ordinary

 Bluemantle Pursuivant of Arms in Ordinary
 Portcullis Pursuivant of Arms in Ordinary
 Rouge Croix Pursuivant of Arms in Ordinary

English Pursuivants of Arms Extraordinary
 Fitzalan Pursuivant of Arms Extraordinary
 Howard Pursuivant of Arms Extraordinary

Scottish Pursuivants of Arms in Ordinary
 Bute Pursuivant of Arms in Ordinary
 Carrick Pursuivant of Arms in Ordinary
 Dingwall Pursuivant of Arms in Ordinary
 Kintyre Pursuivant of Arms in Ordinary
 Ormond Pursuivant of Arms in Ordinary
 Unicorn Pursuivant of Arms in Ordinary

Scottish Pursuivants of Arms Extraordinary
 Linlithgow Pursuivant of Arms Extraordinary
 Falkland Pursuivant of Arms Extraordinary
 March Pursuivant of Arms Extraordinary

Irish Pursuivant of Arms
 Athlone Pursuivant

Welsh Pursuivants of Arms in Ordinary
 Rouge Dragon Pursuivant of Arms in Ordinary

Privately appointed pursuivants
 Slains Pursuivant of Arms
 Garioch Pursuivant of Arms
 Endure Pursuivant of Arms
 Finlaggan Pursuivant of Arms
 Persevante León Blanco de Armas

See also
 Heraldry
 Officer of Arms
 Private Officer of Arms
 The College of Arms
 The Court of the Lord Lyon
 The Canadian Heraldic Authority

References

External links

The Court of the Lord Lyon
The College of Arms
The Canadian Heraldic Authority
The Office of the Chief Herald of Ireland

Officers of arms
Positions of authority
Government occupations